Friends, also known under the original title Przyjaciółki, is a Polish drama which premiered on 6 September 2012 on Polsat.

Plot
The series follow the story of four friends who met in high school. Their paths then diverged. They meet again years later at a class meeting and realise that they need each other like they never did before. The action happens in Warsaw.

Production
The pilot episode was filmed in April 2012. Then it was watched by a group of people similar to the profile of the typical Polsat's viewer. The study found that people are willing to come back to it after an advertising break. A positive test result was reflected in the 13 episodes that filmed from July to September 2012.

Casts 
 Małgorzata Socha as Inga Gruszewska
 Joanna Liszowska as Partycja Kochan
 Anita Sokołowska as Zuzanna Markiewicz
 Magdalena Stużyńska as Anna Strzelecka
 Bartłomiej Kasprzykowski as Paweł, Anna's husband
 Marcin Rogacewicz as Michał, Patrycja's boyfriend
 Adam Krawczyk as Andrzej, Inga's husband
 Agnieszka Sienkiewicz as Dorota, Andrzej's paramour
 Lesław Żurek as Wojtek
 Mariusz Zaniewski as Piotr
 Michał Rolnicki as Rafał
 Pola Figurska/Alicja Wieniawa-Narkiewicz as Hania, Inga's and Andrzej's daughter
 Antoni Borowski as Staś, Anna's and Paweł's son
 Kajetan Borowski as Franek, Anna's and Paweł's son
 Nicole Bogdanowicz as Julka, Anna's and Paweł's daughter
 Zofia Cybul as Marysia, Inga's daughter
 Mateusz Janicki as Maks, Inga's husband
 Paweł Małaszyński as Artur Morawski, Patrycja's neighbour

Ratings
Friends premiered on Polsat on Thursday, 6 September 2012 at 10 pm and attracted the audience of 2.604 million. It reached the share of 25.22% in group "16–49" and 25.05% among all viewers. It was the most watched program in its timeslot.

References

Polish drama television series
2012 Polish television series debuts
2010s Polish television series
2020s Polish television series
Polsat original programming